Stafford is an unincorporated community in Holt County, Nebraska, United States.

History
A post office was established at Stafford in the 1880s. The community was named for Michael Stafford, a railroad official.

References

Unincorporated communities in Holt County, Nebraska
Unincorporated communities in Nebraska